Dian is a given unisex name of:

People:
Dian Agus Prasetyo (born 1985), Indonesian footballer
Dian Bachar (born 1970), American actor
Dian Fossey (1932–1985), American zoologist who studied gorillas
Dian Genchev (born 1975), Bulgarian footballer
Dian HP (born 1965), Indonesian composer
Dian Inggrawati (born 1984), deaf Indonesian beauty queen
Dian Kateliev (born 1980), Bulgarian footballer
Li Dian, 3rd century general who served the Chinese warlord Cao Cao
Dian Moldovanov (born 1985), Bulgarian footballer
Dian Nissen, American trampolinist, fitness professional, and daughter of the inventor of the trampoline 
Dian Slavens (born 1958), American politician

Mythological or fictional characters:
Dian Cecht, the god of healing in Irish mythology
Dian Alberts, on the Dutch soap opera Goede tijden, slechte tijden
Dian Belmont, a DC Comics character

See also
Diane (given name)